Chad Ramey (born August 3, 1992) is an American professional golfer who plays on the PGA Tour. He claimed his breakthrough win on the PGA Tour at the Corales Puntacana Championship in 2022.

Professional career
Ramey turned professional in 2014. He played on the PGA Tour Canada in 2017 and finished 16th on the Order of Merit; claiming a card for the 2018 Web.com Tour season.

Ramey claimed his first professional victory in 2021 at the Live and Work in Maine Open. He also recorded 10 other top-10 finishes in the 2020–21 Korn Ferry Tour season en route to finishing fourth on the Korn Ferry Tour points standings, earning a PGA Tour card for the 2021–22 PGA Tour season.

In March 2022, Ramey claimed his first win on the PGA Tour at the Corales Puntacana Championship. He carded a final-round 67 to beat Ben Martin and Alex Smalley by one shot.

Professional wins (2)

PGA Tour wins (1)

Korn Ferry Tour wins (1)

Korn Ferry Tour playoff record (0–1)

Results in major championships

CUT = missed the half-way cut

Results in The Players Championship

"T" indicates a tie for a place

See also
2021 Korn Ferry Tour Finals graduates

References

External links
 
 

American male golfers
PGA Tour golfers
Mississippi State Bulldogs golfers
Golfers from Mississippi
People from Fulton, Mississippi
1992 births
Living people